Ahmet Üzümcü (born August 30, 1951) is a Turkish career diplomat, who previously served as the Director-General of the Organisation for the Prohibition of Chemical Weapons (OPCW).

He graduated from Foreign Relations Department of the Faculty of Political Science, Ankara University.

Üzümcü was consul at the Consulate General in Aleppo, Syria, and ambassador to Israel from July 28, 1999, to June 30, 2002. Between 2002 and 2004, he served as the Permanent Representative of Turkey to NATO. Üzümcü was appointed Permanent Representative of Turkey to the United Nations Office at Geneva in 2006, serving at this post until 2010. In 2008, he became chair of the Conference on Disarmament. 

Üzümcü received an Honorary Doctorate for Lifetime Achievements in Arms Control and Disarmament from the Geneva School of Diplomacy in 2010 prior to taking up his position at the OPCW.

In 2013, during Ahmet Üzümcü's mandate as Director-General, the Nobel Peace Prize was awarded to the OPCW.

Ahmet Üzümcü is married to Işıl Üzümcü.
In 2016 he inaugurated the academic year of the master's course in International Affairs and Development – Peace Studies at  Paris Dauphine University.

In 2019, he was appointed Honorary Companion of the Order of St Michael and St George (CMG), for services to international diplomacy and the rule of law.

He is a Senior Network Member at the European Leadership Network (ELN).

References 

1951 births
People from Armutlu, Yalova
Ankara University Faculty of Political Sciences alumni
20th-century Turkish diplomats
Ambassadors of Turkey to Israel
Permanent Representatives of Turkey to NATO
Permanent Representatives of Turkey to the United Nations
Directors-general of the Organisation for the Prohibition of Chemical Weapons
Living people
Honorary Companions of the Order of St Michael and St George
21st-century Turkish diplomats